The 1922 Calgary municipal election was held on December 13, 1922, to elect a mayor, commissioner, seven aldermen to sit on Calgary City Council. In addition three members were elected for the public school board.

A swimming pool bylaw was defeated by a large majority.

Three plebiscites were held, one regarding compensation for aldermen, one to change the position of commissioner to an appointment, and one for a service tax. All three plebiscites were defeated.

The election was held under the Single Transferable Voting/Proportional Representation (STV/PR) with the term for candidates being one year.

Results
 bold indicates elected

Mayor

The quota for election was 6,609, with George Harry Webster was elected on the first ballot.

Council

The quota required to be elected was 1,621, there were 12,962 total ballots cast.

Commissioner

There were 13,168 valid ballots, Graves was elected on the 2nd ballot.

School Board

Plebiscites
All plebiscites required a two-thirds majority to pass. Only the reduction in number of commissioners plebiscite passed.

Swimming Pool Bylaw
Plebiscite for Bylaw 2139 - Swimming Pool - Against

Election or appointment of Commissioners
Plebiscite for the election or Appointment of Commissioners. - election

See also
List of Calgary municipal elections

References

1920s in Calgary
Municipal elections in Calgary
1922 elections in Canada